Amerila accra is a moth of the  subfamily Arctiinae. It was described by Strand in 1919. It is found in Ghana.

References

Moths described in 1919
Amerilini
Moths of Africa